Grey Columns, at 399 Old Montgomery Rd. in Tuskegee, Alabama, was built as a plantation house from 1854 to 1857.
It was listed on the National Register of Historic Places in 1980.  It now serves as the home of the president of Tuskegee University.

It was built by William Varner principally in Greek Revival style, but with elements of the Italianate.  It has an octagonal cupola.  It was built at the center of a  cotton plantation.

The listing also includes a contributing structure, which is an addition built around 1920. Former outbuildings and slave quarters are no longer present.

It was documented by the Historic American Buildings Survey in 1934 and in 1978.

References

External links

National Register of Historic Places in Macon County, Alabama
Plantation houses in Alabama
Buildings and structures completed in 1857
Buildings and structures in Macon County, Alabama
Greek Revival architecture in Alabama